The Reiu is a  long river in southwest Estonia. Its source is Soka Lake in Latvia. It flows generally north. It is a left tributary of the Pärnu River into which it flows near the city of Pärnu. The basin area of Reiu is 917 km2 and average discharge 17.3 m³/s.

References 

Rivers of Estonia
Rivers of Latvia
Landforms of Pärnu County
International rivers of Europe